Fritz Hartmann is a Swiss former footballer who played as a midfielder during the 1940s and 1950s.

Hartmann played at least five years for Nordstern Basel and he joined FC Basel's first team in their 1950–51 season under player-coach Ernst Hufschmid. After four test games Hartmann played his domestic league debut for the club in the away game on 3 September 1950 as Basel played 1–1 against Biel-Bienne. That season he played in 23 of the 26 league matches. In the following season he only played in four test games.

In his two seasons with FC Basel, Hartmann played a total of 38 games for the team, but without scoring a goal. 23 of these games were in the Nationalliga A, three in the Swiss Cup and 12 were friendly games.

Following his time with FC Basel Hartmann returned to play for Nordstern Basel.

References

Sources
 Die ersten 125 Jahre. Publisher: Josef Zindel im Friedrich Reinhardt Verlag, Basel. 
 Verein "Basler Fussballarchiv" Homepage

FC Basel players
FC Nordstern Basel players
Association football midfielders
Swiss men's footballers
Year of birth missing
Possibly living people